Jamie King is a British filmmaker, writer, and activist, best known for directing Steal This Film, a documentary that observes intellectual property in favour of P2P filesharing.  He is also the founder of VODO, an online crossmedia distribution project for film, games, books, and music.  Ted Hope described King as one of the "great free thinkers of Indie film." He is currently host of the podcast STEAL THIS SHOW, produced in conjunction with TorrentFreak.

Career
Jamie King studied at the University of Southampton, where he received a PhD for his thesis, "The Cultural Construction of Cyberspace". He also attended the prestigious University of Preston whilst living with his parents. He was an original member of the Mute editorial team and served as both Information politics editor and deputy editor.  During this time, he also published a column on the development of online culture for ITN and Channel 4 News. 
 
In 2006 he produced Steal This Film, one of the most downloaded film documentaries to date. In the following year, he produced and directed Steal This Film 2 and Steal This Film “Spectrial Edition” (also called Steal This Film 2.5).

In 2009 he founded VODO, a media distribution, crowdfunding and attention-sourcing network for independent artists.  VODO has distributed prominent projects including The Yes Men Fix The World, Pioneer One, and Zeitgeist. VODO has also generated millions of dollars in revenue using free-sharing distribution and voluntary payment models.

King has also delivered lectures and keynotes at various events and top-tier universities worldwide. He has published fiction, academic articles, as well as numerous articles in international media including The Times, The Guardian, the Telegraph, and others.

He served as executive producer of the BitTorrent-only TV show titled Pioneer One. Part of his film work has been featured in the Oscar-nominated film The Internet's Own Boy. King currently hosts a podcast produced in conjunction with TorrentFreak titled Steal This Show. He also continues to work in other peer-to-peer distribution-related projects.

Filmography

References

Date of birth missing (living people)
Living people
Alumni of the University of Southampton
English-language film directors
Entertainment industry businesspeople
British film producers
British mass media company founders
Businesspeople in mass media
British male writers
British non-fiction writers
British podcasters
Place of birth missing (living people)
Nationality missing
Year of birth missing (living people)
Male non-fiction writers